Ammocharis is a small genus from sub-Saharan Africa, in the family Amaryllidaceae (subfamily Amaryllidoideae) which includes seven species distributed in Africa.  The plant grows as above-ground bulb, preferring seasonally wet, hot, sandy soils and full sun.

Taxonomy 
Herbert segregated Ammocharis from Crinum in 1821, with two species, A. coranica and A. falcata (both originally Amaryllis). He also placed one of Linnaeus' original Amaryllis species, A. longifolia, in Crinum as C. capense.   This species would also eventually find its way into Ammocharis. In 1847 Roemer placed Amaryllis longifolia in Ammocharis as Ammocharis longifolfolia, (Linn.) Roem. without realising it was conspecific with Ammocharis falcata. However many subsequent authors included only the two original species.

A major review of the genus was undertaken by Milne-Redhead and Schweickerdt in 1939. In their recircumscription they identified five species. With respect to A. longifolia=falcata they concluded that while very closely related it was sufficiently distinct as to deserve of generic status, coining the term Cybistetes , or tumbler,  after the way the wind tumbles the infructescence. From then onwards Cybistetes was treated as a separate genus.

With the development of molecular phylogenetics, Meerow et al. established Amaryllideae and its subtribe Crininae as monophyletic taxa. Under their circumscription  Ammocharis is placed within subtribe Crininae, which has three genera. But, depending on the status of Cybistetes, two to three genera may be considered. If Cybistetes is considered separately as Cybistetes longifolia (L.) Milne-Redh. & Schweick. it is placed in a sister group relationship to Ammocharis within the subtribe, and with Crinum placed as sister to Cybistetes+Ammocharis. Snijman and Kolberg also place this species within Ammocharis, and provide a key to the genus.(2011)

Subdivision
The World Checklist of Selected Plant Families (WCLSPF) list seven species, including Ammocharis longifolia, rather than consider it as the separate monotypic genus, Cybistetes longifolia. The (WCLSPF) places it in Ammocharis, based on Germishuizen and Meyer (2003). This species has also been called Cybistetes herrei (F.M.Leight.) D.Müll.-Doblies & U.Müll.-Doblies or Ammocharis herrei, but if accepted as Ammocharis, then A. longifolia is the preferred name in WCLSPF.

The placement of Ammocharis longifolia (=Cybistetes longifolia) was finally settled following the
detailed study of in depth relationships in Crininae by Kwembeya et al. in 2007, and Cybistetes longifolia restored to Ammocharis.

Ammocharis angolensis (Baker) Milne-Redh. & Schweick. Uganda to Angola
Ammocharis baumii (Harms) Milne-Redh. & Schweick. Tropical Africa to  Namibia
Ammocharis coranica (Ker Gawl.) Herb. Distributed from Zimbabwe to South Africa. Known as "Karoo Lily".
Ammocharis deserticola Snijman & Kolberg
Ammocharis longifolia (L.) Herb. ("Malgas Lily") Southern Namibia and western Cape Province.   
Ammocharis nerinoides (Baker) Lehmiller Namibia
Ammocharis tinneana (Kotschy & Peyr.) Milne-Redh. & Schweick. Distributed from Sudan to Namibia.

Etymology 
The genus name derives from two Greek words: ἄμμος (ammos) sand, and χάρις (charis) joy, signifying "delight of the sandy plains" (where it is found).

References

Bibliography 

  For references to Ammocharis, see pp. 2ff., 5ff. and 17.
 
  (online version)

External links

 Pacific Bulb Society
 Flora of Zimbabwe

Amaryllidaceae genera
Amaryllidoideae